The 2009 NCAA National Collegiate Women's Ice Hockey Tournament involved eight schools playing in single-elimination play to determine the national champion of women's NCAA Division I college ice hockey. It began on March 14, 2009, and ended with the championship game on March 22. The quarterfinals were played at the home sites of the seeded teams and the Frozen Four was played in Boston. A total of seven games were played.

Bracket

Note: * denotes overtime period(s)

External links
2009 Championship Bracket

Tournament
NCAA National Collegiate Women's Ice Hockey Tournament
NCAA National Collegiate Women's Ice Hockey Tournament
Ice hockey competitions in Boston
NCAA National Collegiate Women's Ice Hockey Tournament
NCAA Women's Ice Hockey Tournament
Women's sports in Massachusetts
College sports tournaments in Massachusetts